Kang Min-hee (born December 29, 1991) is a South Korean singer and member of the hip hop duo Miss S. She is best known for her collaborations with her Brand New Music label mates, including Verbal Jint and San E. In 2017, she was a contestant on the survival reality show The Unit.

Discography

Singles

References

External links 
Official website

1991 births
Brand New Music artists
South Korean female idols
Living people
21st-century South Korean singers
21st-century South Korean women singers